Katarina Srebotnik and Ai Sugiyama were the defending champions but chose not to participate this year.

Seeds

Draw

Finals

External links
 Draw

Family Circle Cup - Doubles
Charleston Open